The Iomud is a breed of light horse from Turkmenistan. Like other breeds of Turkmen horse, it is named for the Turkmen tribe that raised it, the Iomud. Both the name of the horse and the name of the Turkmen clan may be spelt in many ways, including Iomud, Yomud, Yamud and Yomut. The Iomud horse is raised in Turkmenistan, particularly in the velayat of Daşoguz; in Uzbekistan; in Karakalpakstan (now part of Uzbekistan), particularly in the Khwarezm region; and in Iraq, Iran and Turkey. Unlike the Akhal-Teke, it usually kept in herds in desert or semi-desert areas.

History 

Like other breeds of Turkmen horse – including the Akhal-Teke, the Ersari, the Goklan, the Salor and the Sarik – the Iomud breed is named for the Turkmen tribe that formed it, the Iomud. The Iomud people occupy the northern part of modern Turkmenistan, from the eastern shores of the Caspian Sea in the west to the area of Daşoguz, on the northern edge of the Karakum Desert, in the north-east. They are principally concentrated in the velayats of Balkan and Daşoguz, and this is considered the area of origin of the Iomud horse.

The early history of the Iomud breed, like that of Turkmen horses in general, is not clear. The qualities of Turkmen horses, and the differences between the various breeds, were recognised by western travellers in the area in the eighteenth and nineteenth centuries. Clement Augustus de Bode wrote in 1848 that the Tekke horses had the best endurance, and were preferred to pure-bred Arabs, while the Iomud and the Goklan were faster and more lightly built.

In the twentieth century, numbers of the Iomud breed declined. In 1980, in the Soviet era, the total number was recorded as 964, of which 616 were considered pure-bred. In 1983 stud farms were set up with the aim of increasing the number of breeding mares from 140 to about 250.  A conservation farm was also established in the Gyzyletrek district, in south-west Turkmenistan.

The Iomud contributed significantly to the development of the Lokai breed in Tajikistan.

Characteristics 

Iomud horses have remarkable endurance. They can carry  without difficulty in mountain or desert terrain.

Iomud horses are usually grey or chestnut; golden chestnut and black can occur.

References

Horse breeds
Horse breeds originating in Turkmenistan